Trainer is a borough in Delaware County, Pennsylvania, United States. The population was 1,828 at the 2010 census, down from 1,901 at the 2000 census. The borough was named after David Trainer, a wealthy textile manufacturer.

History
Trainer is named after the Linwood Mills owner David Trainer Sr.  The borough of Trainer was originally part of Lower Chichester Township and was incorporated as a borough in 1919.

Geography
Trainer is located in southern Delaware County at  (39.828612, -75.403599), on the northwest bank of the Delaware River. It is bordered to the southwest by the borough of Marcus Hook, to the west by the community of Linwood in Lower Chichester Township, to the north by Upper Chichester Township, to the east by the city of Chester, and to the south across the Delaware River by Gloucester County, New Jersey.

Stoney Creek passes through and mouths in the town.

Transportation

U.S. Route 13 crosses the central portion of Trainer, leading northeast through Chester  to Philadelphia and southwest  to Wilmington, Delaware. Pennsylvania Route 291 reaches its western terminus at US 13 in the borough. U.S. Route 13 Business also terminates at the junction of US 13 and PA 291 in Trainer.

Petroleum and port
The shore of the Delaware River is heavily industrialized and is an extension of the Port of Chester. The Stoney Creek Secondary has a rail yard north of its namesake. Delta Air Lines owns an oil refinery in Trainer called the Trainer Refinery. It purchased the refinery for $180 million from Phillips 66.

Educational system
Trainer is a part of Chichester School District. Children within the borough usually attend  Marcus Hook Elementary School (Grades K-4),  Chichester Middle School (Grades 5-8), or Chichester High School (Grades 9-12).

The area Catholic K-8 school is Holy Family Regional Catholic School in Aston.  Trainer previously was served by Resurrection of Our Lord School in Chester. It closed in 1993, with Trainer students moved to what became Holy Savior-St. John Fisher School  in Linwood, which in turn merged into Holy Family in 2012.

Demographics

As of Census 2010, the racial makeup of the borough was 76.4% White, 18.9% African American, 0.3% Native American, 0.5% Asian, 1.7% from other races, and 2.2% from two or more races. Hispanic or Latino of any race were 5.5% of the population .

As of the census of 2000, there were 1,901 people, 712 households, and 489 families residing in the borough. The population density was 1,801.3 people per square mile (692.4/km²). There were 797 housing units at an average density of 755.2 per square mile (290.3/km²). The racial makeup of the borough was 88.58% White, 9.21% African American, 0.05% Native American, 0.16% Asian, 1.00% from other races, and 1.00% from two or more races. Hispanic or Latino of any race were 2.52% of the population.

There were 712 households, out of which 32.3% had children under the age of 18 living with them, 44.7% were married couples living together, 17.7% had a female householder with no husband present, and 31.2% were non-families. 27.1% of all households were made up of individuals, and 12.4% had someone living alone who was 65 years of age or older. The average household size was 2.67 and the average family size was 3.23.

In the borough the population was spread out, with 27.7% under the age of 18, 7.8% from 18 to 24, 29.3% from 25 to 44, 21.3% from 45 to 64, and 13.9% who were 65 years of age or older. The median age was 36 years. For every 100 females, there were 95.8 males. For every 100 females age 18 and over, there were 93.2 males.

The median income for a household in the borough was $34,250, and the median income for a family was $45,625. Males had a median income of $39,293 versus $26,719 for females. The per capita income for the borough was $15,753. About 14.9% of families and 16.5% of the population were below the poverty line, including 18.2% of those under age 18 and 13.1% of those age 65 or over.

References

External links

 Borough of Trainer official website

Populated places established in 1919
Boroughs in Delaware County, Pennsylvania
1919 establishments in Pennsylvania
Pennsylvania populated places on the Delaware River